Ramsey may refer to:

Geography

British Isles
 Ramsey, Cambridgeshire, a small market town in England
 Ramsey, Essex, a village near Harwich, England
 Ramsey and Parkeston, a civil parish formerly called just "Ramsey"
 Ramsey, Isle of Man, the third-largest town on the island
 Ramsey Bay, Isle of Man
 Ramsey Island, off the coast of the St David's peninsula in Pembrokeshire, Wales

Canada
 Ramsey, Ontario, Canada, an unincorporated area and ghost town
 Ramsey Lake, Ontario, Canada

United States
 Ramsey, California (disambiguation)
 Ramsey, Illinois, a village
 Ramsey, Indiana, an unincorporated community
 Ramsey, Minnesota, a city
 Ramsey, Mower County, Minnesota, an unincorporated community
 Ramsey, New Jersey, a borough
 Ramsey, Ohio, an unincorporated community
 Ramsey, Virginia, an unincorporated community
 Ramsey, West Virginia, an unincorporated community
 Ramsey County, Minnesota
 Ramsey County, North Dakota
 Ramsey Lake (Minnesota)
 Ramsey Township, Fayette County, Illinois
 Ramsey Township, Kossuth County, Iowa

Elsewhere
 Ramsey Glacier, Ross Dependency, Antarctica

People
 Ramsey (given name), people with the given name
 Ramsey (surname), people with the surname
 Baron de Ramsey, a title in the Peerage of the United Kingdom, including a list of the barons

Buildings
 Ramsey Abbey, a former Benedictine abbey near Ramsey, Cambridgeshire
 Ramsey Center, a multi-purpose arena in Cullowhee, North Carolina
 Ramsey House (disambiguation), houses on the US National Register of Historic Places
 Ramsey Mill and Old Mill Park, Hastings, Minnesota
 Ramsey Windmill, Essex, a grade II listed post mill at Ramsey, Essex

Mathematics
 Ramsey theory
Ramsey numbers 
Ramsey's theorem

Schools
 Ramsey Grammar School, Ramsey, Isle of Man
 Ramsey High School (disambiguation), several schools in the US
 The Ramsey Academy, a coeducational secondary school in Halstead, Essex, England

Ships
 , several British Royal Navy ships
 , a passenger steamship sunk in the First World War
 USS Ramsey (FFG-2), a US Navy guided missile frigate

Sports
 Ramsey A.F.C., a football club on the Isle of Man
 Ramsey R.U.F.C., a rugby union team on the Isle of Man

Other uses
 Ramsey (chip), the RAM controller in some Amiga computers

See also
 Ramsay (disambiguation)
 Ramsey railway station (disambiguation)
 Ramzi (disambiguation)
 Rasey